East Perth was an electoral district of the Legislative Assembly in the Australian state of Western Australia from 1890 to 1962.

Based in inner urban Perth, the district was one of the original 30 seats contested at the 1890 election. The district's member from 1894 to 1904 was Walter James, who served as Premier of Western Australia from 1902 to 1904. When the district was abolished at the 1962 election, its member at the time, Herb Graham of the Labor Party, transferred to the new seat of Balcatta.

Members

Election results

East Perth